YouX (Formerly AUU) is a student union at the University of Adelaide, South Australia. It provides academic advocacy, welfare, and counselling services to students free of charge, funds the student newspaper On Dit, and owns a number of commercial operations on campus. It also oversees the Student Representative Council (SRC), an organisationally separate body responsible for student political representation.

The Adelaide University Union was founded in 1895 and as of 1971 is recognised as a statutory corporation under the legislation governing the University of Adelaide.
Oscar Zi Shao Ong is the current president of YouX, He is also the president of CISA.

History
The AUU was founded in 1895.
YouX was formerly called the Adelaide University Union until the controversial rebranding in 2022. YouX organisers have repeatedly refused to give reason for or provide details about the cost of the rebranding. The rebrand was quickly slammed as thoughtless and rushed, with students being directed to a pornographic adult website with the same name.

Formal relationship with the University of Adelaide
The AUU is a statutory corporation under the legislation governing the University of Adelaide.

Since 2008, The AUU/YouX has relied on the University of Adelaide for the majority of its funding. This is a result of a funding agreement with the University.

The ultimate existence of The AUU/YouX, and its relationship with the university, is governed by the University of Adelaide Act 1971. This Act of the South Australian Parliament gives the University of Adelaide Council certain powers over YouX. YouX cannot alter its constitution or rules, or charge a membership fee, without the agreement of University Council. Furthermore, YouX is bound to provide University Council with its financial reports and budget for the coming calendar year prior to 1 December.

In 2009, the Adelaide University Sports Association, previously an affiliate of The AUU/YouX, began the process of disaffiliation from the Union, having secured a separate funding agreement with the University.

Student governance

YouX is governed by a board of management. The board consists of 10 ordinary members, who are not also permanent staff of YouX, five of whom are elected annually on two-year terms by the students of the University. The Board then elects several of its members to positions within YouX, such as Union President, Vice President, Student Media Committee Chair and Clubs Committee Chair. Elections are held annually in September, with the Board-elect and officer bearers taking their positions on 1 December.

Notable past presidents include former South Australian Premier John Bannon, former South Australia Attorney-General Chris Sumner, Australia's first female Prime Minister Julia Gillard (1981–1982) and former South Australian Supreme Court Judges Elliott Johnston and Samuel Jacobs.

YouX publishes the student newspaper On Dit, the third oldest student newspaper in Australia.

Impact of VSU
The post-Voluntary Student Unionism (VSU) period contained significant financial difficulties for YouX. Previously funded by compulsory fees paid by all students, the introduction of voluntary unionism resulted in a sharp drop in income for the Union. This resulted in grave financial difficulties. In late 2007, the AUU handed control of Union House and the vast majority of YouX's commercial services to the University of Adelaide. This was in return for the University agreeing to fund the Union for a period of ten years. The University of Adelaide paid $1.2 million to the Union in the first year of this funding agreement, with future funding to be determined on a year-to-year basis. This gives the University final control over the size of the AUU/YouX's budget in any given year.

References

External links
 

Students' unions in Australia